Nelson Central is the central suburb and central business district of Nelson, New Zealand.

Amenities

The suburb includes the Christ Church Cathedral and the surrounding Church Hill reserve.

Nelson Provincial Museum, the regional museum, is located in Nelson Central. It opened in its first form in 1842, making it New Zealand's first and oldest museum. 

The Suter Art Gallery was established in 1899,

Other public reserves and facilities in the area include Anzac Memorial Park, Erin Reserve, Hallowell Cemetery, Old Bank Lane Gardens, Paru Paru Reserve, Princes Lookout Reserve, Quakers Acre Cemetery, Queens Gardens, the Riverside Reserve and Pool Complex, and Rutherford Park.

Demographics

Nelson Central-Trafalgar had a population of 675 at the 2018 New Zealand census, an increase of 96 people (16.6%) since the 2013 census, and an increase of 192 people (39.8%) since the 2006 census. There were 228 households. There were 378 males and 297 females, giving a sex ratio of 1.27 males per female. The median age was 35.5 years (compared with 37.4 years nationally), with 75 people (11.1%) aged under 15 years, 195 (28.9%) aged 15 to 29, 321 (47.6%) aged 30 to 64, and 87 (12.9%) aged 65 or older.

Ethnicities were 68.9% European/Pākehā, 12.4% Māori, 1.8% Pacific peoples, 21.3% Asian, and 2.7% other ethnicities (totals add to more than 100% since people could identify with multiple ethnicities).

The proportion of people born overseas was 39.6%, compared with 27.1% nationally.

Although some people objected to giving their religion, 52.0% had no religion, 27.1% were Christian, 8.0% were Hindu, 1.8% were Muslim, 3.1% were Buddhist and 4.9% had other religions.

Of those at least 15 years old, 138 (23.0%) people had a bachelor or higher degree, and 60 (10.0%) people had no formal qualifications. The median income was $23,300, compared with $31,800 nationally. The employment status of those at least 15 was that 255 (42.5%) people were employed full-time, 132 (22.0%) were part-time, and 42 (7.0%) were unemployed.

Education

Nelson College for Girls is a state secondary school for Year 9 to 13 girls.

Nelson College for Girls Preparatory School is a private preparatory school for Year 7 to 8 girls, based on the Nelson College for Girls campus.

References 

Suburbs of Nelson, New Zealand
Populated places in the Nelson Region
Central business districts in New Zealand